Kyaw Swe (10 February 1924 – 15 August 1982) was a Burmese actor and film director.

Biography
Kyaw Swe was born Maw Ni in 1924 in Yangon to U Ba Nit and Daw Ohn Sein. He attended the St. John's High School, and during World War II he was chief of law in Bago. He joined BDA during the war. He entered into film around 1945. He became a film actor, changing his name to Kyaw Swe, and appeared in the film Saw Ya San Sha, a silent film, directed by Ba Shin. It was produced by the British-Burma Film company (later, "Nyunt Myanmar" ).

He moved to the A-One Film Company and he starred in the films of "Bogyoke", "Ta Thwe Ta Mya", and "Ahtauttaw" and "Chit Ye Baw" directed by Chin Sein (Shwe Nyar Maung). He also starred in "Bo Aung Din" and "Thar Bo Aung Din" directed by Shwe Don Bi Aung, "The Hsaung Hayman" directed by Thukha, "Phyay Yort Khway" directed by Chit Khin, "Min Aung Min Naung" directed by Aung Gyi and "Hpuza Nit Khine" directed by Hla Oo (Lu-Gyan Hla Maung Lay) for the British Burma Company.

In 1961, he went to Japan to study film-making. He established his own film company. His first directed film was "Pale Myetyay (Pearl Tear)” and he starred in that film, with actress Khin Yu May, a war film. He also directed "Chit Myitta, "Ma chu tar the", "The myat tar lane", "Sane". Between 1945 and 1982, he regularly worked as both a director and an actor. His last film is "Mwe Mwe chin Che Myin". He died on 15 August 1982. He was survived by his wife, Nwe Nwe, and five children.

Filmography
Saw Ya San Sha
Bogyoke
Ta Thwe Ta Mya
Ahtauktaw
Chit Ye Baw
Son Bo Aung Din
The Hsaung Hayman
Phyay Yort Khway
Min aung Min Naung
Hpuza Nit Khine
Pale Myetyay
Chit Myitta
Ma chu tar the
the myat tar lane
Sane
Mwe Mwe chin Che Myin
Thamudaya Thanyawzin (feat his own daughter)
Poan Pamar
Ta Char Gabar Ka Chitthu Ye
ิิิ่*Kya-nor Ne Ko Ba Kyaw
Sein-ta-yit Mya-ta-yit

1982 deaths
1924 births
People from Yangon
Burmese male film actors
Burmese film directors
20th-century Burmese male actors